Mhasurne is a village in Khatav taluk and Satara district, Maharashtra, India. It is located 64 km towards East from District headquarters Satara. 21 km from Khatav & 30km from Karad.285 km from State capital Mumbai.

References 

Villages in Satara district